Asperula acuminata is a deciduous species of perennial groundcover, and a flowering plant in the family Rubiaceae, known as Woodruff, and is endemic to NE. New South Wales of Australia, and was first named by I.Thomps.

Description
Asperula acuminata appears as a small green moss-like plant, with small (1in) pale pink flowers, on stems, it has a compact cushion of small, green, needle-like, leaves.

Growth cycle
Asperula acuminata flowers around May-June, and grows best in a rock garden, trough or crevice.

References

acuminata